Beyrède-Jumet (Gascon: Veireda e Jumet) is a former commune in the Hautes-Pyrénées department in southwestern France. On 1 January 2019, it was merged into the new commune Beyrède-Jumet-Camous.

Population

See also
Communes of the Hautes-Pyrénées department

References

Former communes of Hautes-Pyrénées